Goodenia quadrifida is a species of flowering plant in the family Goodeniaceae and is endemic to a restricted part of the Northern Territory. It is an ascending herb with glabrous foliage, narrow oblong to lance-shaped leaves at the base of the plant and racemes of purplish-brown flowers.

Description
Flowering occurs in May and the fruit is a more or less spherical capsule  in diameter. This goodenia is similar to G. purpurea but is distinguished from it by its style that has a four-branched tip.

Taxonomy and naming
This species was first formally described in 1979 by Roger Charles Carolin in the journal Brunonia and given the name Calogyne quadrifida from specimens collected by Norman Byrnes in 1967. In 1990, Carolin changed the name to Goodenia quadrifida in the journal Telopea. The specific epithet (quadrifida) means "split into four parts".

Distribution and habitat
This goodenia grows in cracking black clay soil plains in Arnhem Land where it is a rare species.

Conservation status
Goodenia quadrifida is listed as "vulnerable" under the Australian Government Environment Protection and Biodiversity Conservation Act 1999 but as "data deficient" under the Northern Territory Government Northern Territory Government Territory Parks and Wildlife Conservation Act 1976 because of "the high degree of taxonomic uncertainty" regarding its relation to G. purpurea.

References

quadrifida
Flora of the Northern Territory
Plants described in 1979
Taxa named by Roger Charles Carolin
Endemic flora of Australia